The Tucumilla Formation is a Tremadocian geologic formation of southern Bolivia. The sandstones, shales and siltstones crop out in the José María Avilés and Eustaquio Méndez Provinces.

Fossil content 
The formation has provided the following fossils:

 Apheoorthis samensis
 Notorthisina notoconcha
 Angelina sp.
 Asaphellus sp.
 Broeggeria sp.
 Bucania sp.
 Dictyonema sp.
 Finkelnburgia sp.
 Jujuyaspis sp.
 Kainella sp.
 Leptoplastides sp.
 Micragnostus sp.
 Parabolina sp.
 Richardsonella sp.
 Shumardia sp.
 Tropidodiscus sp.

See also 
 List of fossiliferous stratigraphic units in Bolivia

References

Further reading 
 V. Havlicek and L. Branisa. 1980. Ordovician brachiopods of Bolivia: Succession of assemblages, climate control, affinity to Anglo-French and Bohemian provinces. Rozpravy Ceskoslovenske Akademie Ved. Rada Matematickych a Prirodnich Ved. Academia Praha, Prague, Czechoslovakia 90(1):1-54
 A. Pribyl and J. Vanek. 1980. Ordovician trilobites of Bolivia. Rozpravy Ceskoslovenske Akademie Ved. Rada Matematickych a Prirodnich Ved. Academia Praha, Prague, Czechoslovakia 90(2):1-90

Geologic formations of Bolivia
Ordovician System of South America
Ordovician Bolivia
Tremadocian
Sandstone formations
Shale formations
Siltstone formations
Shallow marine deposits
Ordovician southern paleotemperate deposits
Formations